Sergio Adrián Flores Reyes (born 12 February 1995) is a Mexican professional footballer who plays as a defensive midfielder for Liga MX club Guadalajara.

Career

Guadalajara
Flores made his professional debut in a Copa MX match against Mineros de Zacatecas on 28 July 2015.

Loan at Coras
In December 2016, it was announced Flores was sent out on loan to Ascenso MX club Coras de Tepic in order to gain professional playing experience. He scored a goal on his debut on 8 January 2015 against Murciélagos; the match ended in a 6–0 win.

Honours
Guadalajara
Copa MX: Apertura 2015

Mexico U20
CONCACAF U-20 Championship: 2015

References

1995 births
Living people
Footballers from Coahuila
Mexican footballers
People from Torreón
Association football midfielders
Mexico under-20 international footballers
2015 CONCACAF U-20 Championship players
Coras de Nayarit F.C. footballers
Club Atlético Zacatepec players
Mineros de Zacatecas players